Tomokazu is a masculine Japanese given name.

Possible writings
Tomokazu can be written using different combinations of kanji characters. Some examples:

友一, "friend, one"
友和, "friend, harmony"
友多, "friend, many"
友数, "friend, number"
知一, "know, one"
知和, "know, harmony"
知多, "know, many"
知数, "know, number"
智一, "intellect, one"
智和, "intellect, harmony"
智多, "intellect, many"
智数, "intellect, number"
共一, "together, one"
共和, "together, harmony"
朋一, "companion, one"
朋和, "companion, harmony"
朝一, "morning/dynasty, one"
朝和, "morning/dynasty, harmony"
朝多, "morning/dynasty, many"
朝数, "morning/dynasty, number"

The name can also be written in hiragana ともかず or katakana トモカズ.

Notable people with the name
, Japanese cyclist
, Japanese table tennis player
, Japanese footballer
, Japanese drifting driver
, Japanese sumo wrestler
, Japanese actor
, Japanese footballer
, Japanese footballer
, Japanese voice actor
, Japanese voice actor
, Japanese anime director
, Japanese archer
, Japanese actor

Japanese masculine given names